Bergdoll is a surname. Notable people with the surname include:

Barry Bergdoll (born 1955), American art historian
Grover Cleveland Bergdoll (1893–1966), American aviator, racing driver, and World War I draft dodger

See also
Bergdoll Mansion
Louis Bergdoll House